"Doin It" is the second single from LL Cool J's sixth album, Mr. Smith, and was released on February 20, 1996 for Def Jam Recordings. Based on a sample of Grace Jones' "My Jamaican Guy", it also featured LeShaun (who previously released a song with the same sample and theme in 1988 titled "Wild Thang"), production from Rashad "Ringo" Smith and LL Cool J. In several interviews, both the artist and producer stated that the instrumental was originally meant for The Notorious B.I.G., to be used for a song and single on his Life After Death album, which was posthumously released.

"Doin It" was a success for LL Cool J, making it to number 9 on the Billboard Hot 100 and number 7 on the Hot R&B/Hip-Hop Songs Billboard chart.  On the B-side was the previous single, "Hey Lover".

The remix featured on the soundtrack to The Nutty Professor samples the Art of Noise's "Moments in Love."

The crowd noise played throughout the song, shouting "Go Brooklyn", is sampled from "Go Stetsa" by Stetsasonic.  Keri Hilson sampled this song in her song "Do It" featuring Tank for her debut album In a Perfect World... Rapper Fabolous sampled the song for his song "Doin it Well" featuring Nicki Minaj and Trey Songz for his mixtape Summertime Shootout.

The song has the singers rapping about their sexual desire for each other.

Music video
The video was shot in December 1995, and it was directed by Hype Williams. LeShaun did not appear in the music video, as she was pregnant at the time, so different models took her place and lip synced her parts.

This song interpolates "Wild Thang" by 2 Much, a group LeShaun was in. The beginning of "Wild Thang" was reused as the hook for "Doin' It".

Track listing

A-side
"Doin It" (LP Version)- 4:40 
"Doin It" (Unarmed Version)- 4:05

B-side
"Hey Lover" (Street Version)- 4:04 
"Hey Lover" (Street Instrumental)- 4:04

Charts

Weekly charts

Year-end charts

Certifications and sales

References

1996 songs
1996 singles
LL Cool J songs
Def Jam Recordings singles
Dirty rap songs
Music videos directed by Hype Williams
Songs written by LL Cool J
Songs about casual sex